Thomas Lynch was an American soccer midfielder who was a member of the U.S. national team at the 1934 FIFA World Cup. He was born in Fall River, Massachusetts.

In 1934, Lynch was called into the U.S. team for the 1934 FIFA World Cup. However, he did not enter the lone U.S. game of the tournament, a 7-1 loss to eventual champion Italy.

Lynch played professionally in the American Soccer League, being listed with Brooklyn Celtic during the World Cup.  In 1935, he was with the New York Americans. 

Sportspeople from Fall River, Massachusetts
Soccer players from Massachusetts
American soccer players
American Soccer League (1933–1983) players
Brooklyn Celtic players
New York Americans (soccer) (1933–1956) players
1934 FIFA World Cup players
Year of birth missing
Year of death missing
Association football midfielders